Gressittella is a genus of leaf beetles in the subfamily Eumolpinae. The genus is endemic to New Guinea, and is named after Judson Linsley Gressitt.

Species
 Gressittella laevis Medvedev, 2009
 Gressittella obscura Medvedev, 2009
 Gressittella riedeli Medvedev, 2009

References

Eumolpinae
Chrysomelidae genera
Beetles of Oceania
Insects of New Guinea
Endemic fauna of New Guinea